Metamorphosis: The Alien Factor, also known as The Deadly Spawn II, is an American 1990 science fiction horror film written and directed by Glenn Takajian and produced by Ted A. Bohus.

Plot

An alien from outer space bites a bio-researcher on the hand and turns him into a monster. Its first victim is the guard at the laboratory he's working in. The guard's daughters are getting worried that their father hasn't called them and they go to the lab, where they meet their worst nightmare.

Cast
Matt Kulis as John Griffen
Patrick Barnes as Brian
Tara Leigh as Sherry Griffen
Dianna Flaherty as Kim Griffen
Katherine Romaine as Nancy Kane
Marcus Powell as Dr. Viallini
Allen Lewis Rickman as Dr. Elliot Stein
George G. Colucci as Dr. Michael Foster (as George Gerard)
Colton Wayne as Mitchell
Greg Sullivan as Jarrett

Production

Following on the moderate success of 1983's The Deadly Spawn, Ted A. Bohus and partner Dr. Ron Giannotto chose to surpass this success with a sequel, but the storyline evolved into something different. Having a slightly larger budget than for 'Spawn', Metamorphosis: The Alien Factor began production in an abandoned Jersey City warehouse with exterior and some interior shots in a Hackensack office building using childhood friends and New Jersey and New York City locals.

Release

Home media
The film was released on videocassette by Vidmark Entertainment in 1993, and by Lionsgate on October 13, 2003.

Reception

TV Guide awarded the film 3/5 stars, writing, "The title may sound generic, but Metamorphosis: The Alien Factor is an unusually vivid and accomplished low-budget horror film, a science fiction chiller that stretches its budget well and whips up some solid frights." The Video Graveyard gave the film a negative review, calling it "Effects-laden trash", criticizing the special effects, script, and dialogue.

Further reading
The stop-motion filmography by Neil Pettigrew

References

External links
 
 
 

1990 films
1990 horror films
1990s monster movies
1990s science fiction horror films
American monster movies
American science fiction horror films
Films about shapeshifting
Lionsgate films
1990s English-language films
1990s American films